Who's Hugh is a 1943 American film from Columbia.

Cast
Hugh Herbert
Constance Worth

External links
Who's Hugh? at IMDb

1943 films
American comedy films
1943 comedy films
American black-and-white films
1940s American films